Tayla Bruce (born 22 February 1995) is a New Zealand international lawn bowls player.

Bowls career
Born in Christchurch in 1995, Bruce plays for the Burnside Bowling Club. She won the 2017 national women's fours title, in a team with Jo Edwards, Val Smith, and Kirsten Edwards. At the annual Canterbury awards, she was named as sportswoman of the year and young player of the year.

She was selected as part of the New Zealand team for the 2018 Commonwealth Games on the Gold Coast in Queensland.

A second national fours title was secured in 2020, playing alongside Sandra Keith, Clare Hendra, and Selina Smith. During the same year she was selected for the 2020 World Outdoor Bowls Championship in Australia.

In 2022, she won her third national title after securing the singles crown. Also in 2022, she competed in the women's triples and the women's fours at the 2022 Commonwealth Games. She won double bronze; in the triples playing with Nicole Toomey and Val Smith and in the fours, playing with Selina Goddard, Toomey and Smith. In November 2022, she won the gold medal at the World Singles Champion of Champions in Wellington, New Zealand.

In January 2023, Bruce won the national women's pairs title with Clare Hendra.

References

External links
 
 
 

1995 births
Living people
New Zealand female bowls players
Commonwealth Games competitors for New Zealand
Commonwealth Games bronze medallists for New Zealand
Commonwealth Games medallists in lawn bowls
Bowls players at the 2018 Commonwealth Games
Bowls players at the 2022 Commonwealth Games
20th-century New Zealand women
21st-century New Zealand women
Medallists at the 2022 Commonwealth Games